HMS Bisham was one of 93 ships of the   of inshore minesweepers.

Their names were all chosen from villages ending in -ham. The minesweeper was named after Bisham in Berkshire.

References
 

 

Ham-class minesweepers
Royal Navy ship names
1954 ships
Ships built in England